Thomas Joseph Carey (March 1846 – August 16, 1906), born J. J. Norton, was an American shortstop in Major League Baseball.

Born in Brooklyn, New York, Carey joined the 17th New York Volunteer Infantry in September 1863. He claimed to have fought at Bentonville, Jonesboro and Atlanta before being discharged in July 1865.

Carey played a total of nine seasons of baseball, five of which were in the National Association (1871–1875), and the other four in the National League. During two of the seasons in the National Association, he also spent some time as player-manager, with a career record of 27 wins and 21 losses.

Carey played as a second baseman in his first three seasons in the National Association, and went hitless in three at bats for the Fort Wayne Kekiongas in the first professional game ever played on May 4, 1871, against the Cleveland Forest Citys.

After his playing days were over, he spent the 1882 season as an umpire.

In May 1906, The San Francisco Call reported that Carey was struggling financially and that he was standing in the city's bread lines. He died later that year and is buried at the San Francisco National Cemetery.

References

External links

Major League Baseball shortstops
Major League Baseball second basemen
Baltimore Marylands (NABBP) players
Fort Wayne Kekiongas players
Baltimore Canaries players
New York Mutuals players
Hartford Dark Blues players
Providence Grays players
Cleveland Blues (NL) players
Baltimore Canaries managers
New York Mutuals managers
Baseball player-managers
Sportspeople from Brooklyn
Baseball players from New York City
19th-century baseball players
Syracuse Stars (minor league baseball) players
San Francisco Eagles players
San Francisco Athletics players
1846 births
1906 deaths
Union Army soldiers